Dragon's teeth or dragon's tooth may refer to:

 Dragon's teeth (mythology), in Greek mythology; once planted, each tooth grew into an armed warrior.

Books
 Dragon's Teeth: A Novel, an 1878 realist novel by José Maria de Eça de Queiroz
 The Dragon's Teeth, a 1939 mystery novel by Ellery Queen
 Dragon's Teeth (novel), a 1942 Pulitzer Prize-winning historical novel by Upton Sinclair
 Dragon's teeth: the background, contents and consequences of the North Atlantic Pact, 1949 non-fiction book by Konni Zilliacus
 "Dragons' Teeth" (short story), a 1977 fantasy short story by David Drake
 The Dragon's Teeth?, a 1982 American book by Benjamin S. Kelsey
 The Dragon's Tooth, a 2011 fantasy novel by N.D. Wilson
 Dragon's Teeth Mountains, a fictional mountain range in the Shannara series of books
 Dragon Teeth, a posthumous novel by late Michael Crichton (published in May 2017)
Pull the Dragon Tooth (novel)  a Mice king fantasy story by Geronimo Stilton.

Other media
 "The Dragon's Teeth" (radio), a 1941 radio story
 "Dragon's Teeth" (Star Trek: Voyager), a 1999 television episode
 Dragon's Tooth (video game), a 1986 British video game
 Dragon's Teeth, the fourth expansion pack for the video game Battlefield 4

Places
 Dragons Teeth (Antarctica), a small group of rocks in Antarctica
 Dragon's Teeth Gate, a craggy granite outcrop in Singapore
 Dragon's Tooth (Virginia), a trail landmark in Virginia

Other uses
 Dragon's teeth (fortification), anti-tank obstacles
 Dragon's teeth (plant), a plant species in the genus Lotus
 Dragon's Teeth (traffic), a series of calibrated lines painted on a road surface to enforce a speed limit

See also 
 Dragontooth (disambiguation)